The 2003 Furman Paladins football team was an American football team that represented Furman University as a member of the Southern Conference (SoCon) during the 2003 NCAA Division I-AA football season. In their first year under head coach Bobby Lamb, the Paladins compiled an overall record of 6–5 with a conference mark of 4–4, finishing tied for fourth in the SoCon.

Schedule

References

Furman
Furman Paladins football seasons
Furman Paladins football